Epimachus is a genus of birds of paradise from New Guinea. 

Epimachus may also refer to:
Epimachus of Athens (c. 300 BC), ancient Greek engineer and architect
Saint Epimachus (died 362), Roman martyr
Saint Epimachus of Pelusium, Egyptian martyr